Interlego AG v Tyco Industries Inc ([1989] AC 217, also known informally as the Lego case or the Lego brick case) was a case in copyright law that originated in Hong Kong that eventually went before the Judicial Committee of the Privy Council in the United Kingdom.

Action 
The plaintiff, Interlego AG, sued the defendant, Tyco Industries, for copyright infringement of its Lego bricks.  However, it had previously registered its design. Under section 10 of the Copyright Act 1956, the right to protection as a registered design and copyright were not cumulative rights.  The copyright was also a stronger right than the right to protection as a registered design.  It had a longer duration.

Thus the plaintiff also moved for the court to determine that its bricks did not qualify for design protection under section 10 of the Copyright Act, so that they could qualify for copyright protection.  To do so, the court had to apply a test to determine whether the bricks comprised a degree of aesthetic appeal, above the purely functional elements of their design, which would cause them to qualify to be registered designs.

To extend protection under the Copyright Act, the plaintiff argued that it had made revisions to its design drawings, and that as such they comprised original artistic works.  The Copyright Act gave extensive protection to such drawings, including defining the making of an object from such a drawing an infringement of copyright, or that copying an object directly, without reference to its design drawings, constituted infringement of the copyright in the drawings.

Judgement 
The court held that the bricks qualified for registered design protection, and thus did not qualify for copyright protection. Lord Oliver wrote:

The court further held that design drawings were a combination of both artistic and literary works.  The written matter on such a drawing comprised the literary matter, and the graphics the artistic matter.

The only changes made to the drawings were alterations to some radii and to the dimensions of some elements:

Lord Oliver held that to afford copyright protection on a copy of a work, "[t]here must in addition be some element of material alteration or embellishment which suffices to make the totality of the work an original work".  He stated that such an alteration or embellishment must be "visually significant", and that it is insufficient simply for the alteration to convey "information".  Thus the court held that the modifications that Interlego had made to its designs did not constitute an original work, and thus were not afforded copyright protection.  Although they may have involved skill, labour, and judgement, that skill, labour, and judgement lay solely in the process of copying.

References

External links 
Interlego A.G v Tyco Industries Inc & Ors (Hong Kong): full text of the decision.

United Kingdom copyright case law
Judicial Committee of the Privy Council cases on appeal from Hong Kong
1988 in case law
1988 in Hong Kong
1988 in British law
Lego